Companion Pieces: Fantasy Furnishing is a 1982 fantasy role-playing game supplement published by The Companions.

Contents
Companion Pieces: Fantasy Furnishing is a set of three 8 1/2" by 11" black-on-white sheets with self-stick backing, shrink-wrapping in an 11" by 17" folded card cover.  They were designed to be pressed on cardboard then be cut out.

Reception
Lewis Pulsipher reviewed Companion Pieces: Fantasy Furnishing in The Space Gamer No. 57. Pulsipher commented that "This kind of thing is certainly not necessary to fantasy gaming, but it is competently produced for those who value the idea."

References

Fantasy role-playing game supplements
Role-playing game supplements introduced in 1982